Rajalakshmi School of Architecture is an architecture college in Thandalam, near Chennai, Tamil Nadu, India. The college was established in 2010  by the Rajalakshmi Educational Trust, Rajalakshmi Institutions and has been approved by All India Council of Technical Education (AICTE), New Delhi.  It is an affiliate of Anna University, South India with the intake of 80 students. The college is located near Hyundai Motors and SIPCOT.

Sister Concerned Institutions

See also

 Rajalakshmi Institutions
 Rajalakshmi Engineering College
 Rajalakshmi Institute of Technology
 Anna University
 Anna University Chennai
 National Board of Accreditation
 National Assessment & Accreditation Council
 All India Council for Technical Education
 Council of Architecture
 List of architecture schools

References

External links 
Rajalakshmi School of Architecture Website - Official Website

Architecture schools in India
Universities and colleges in Kanchipuram district
Rajalakshmi Institutions
Educational institutions established in 2010
2010 establishments in Tamil Nadu